Dejan Stanković (born 17 September 1957) is a Serbian former football player and current football manager. He also holds Austrian citizenship.

Playing career
Stanković started his career at Red Star Belgrade (six seasons) before moving to Austria to play for ASK Voitsberg, NK Olimpija Ljubljana (two seasons), and NK Maribor. After starting at NK Maribor in 1983, he had a successful streak in the 2nd division. In addition to his technical skills, the then 26-year-old striker impressed with his speed. After two seasons he moved to the Lower Austrian football club SC Krems. Soon after, he moved to Styria for DSV Leoben, where he was in the first and after relegation in the first division was engaged. Stankovic later changed from striker to defender based on his experience and age and held this position until the end of his career as an active footballer.

Coaching career

Stanković began his coaching career with ASK Voitsberg in 1997 and managed different clubs in Austria. In 2005 he received an offer from DSV Leoben to take on the vacant coaching position. He achieved a midfield position in the first division in two seasons. He also trained his son Marko Stanković with the Donawitzers, who became a regular player on the team under him.

After a misguided start to the third season, Stanković was relieved of his job as a coach in November 2007. In spring 2008 he took over the coaching position at FC Waidhofen / Ybbs in the Regionalliga Ost. After an unsuccessful match with the Lower Austrians, he was replaced by Heinz Thonhofer.

At the beginning of January 2009, Stanković was signed as a successor to Andrzej Lesiak from 1. FC Vöcklabruck for the First League. At the beginning of the 2009/10 season, he switched back to DSV Leoben, which had relocated to the Regionalliga Mitte. On September 9, 2009, Stanković left DSV Leoben by mutual agreement.

Stanković was then without employment until 2011, and spent the time training, until joining the Styrian national team SC Liezen in 2013. After he left the club after less than a year in the summer of 2014, Stanković was hired as a coach from the 2014/15 season by SV Hinterberg. He then left the sixth division in early July 2015 when he was replaced by Alexander Lasselsberger. From summer 2016 he then trained the ESV Knittelfeld in the Styrian Oberliga Nord (5th league) but was released at the end of October 2016 after the team only ranked ninth in the table.

Soon after, Stanković took over as coach at the SC St. Peter / Freienstein in the Minor League North B.

References

1957 births
Living people
Yugoslav footballers
Serbian football managers
Association football forwards
Austrian Football Bundesliga players
2. Liga (Austria) players